Double First is a 1988 British television sitcom that aired seven episodes on BBC 1. Written by the comedy writing duo  Esmonde and Larbey, the series was directed by Gareth Gwenlan. It starred Michael Williams as N. V. Standish, Ann Bell as Mary Webster, Jennifer Hilary	as Louise Hobson, Holly Aird as Ellen Hobson, Clive Merrison as	Derek, and Peter Tuddenham as William.

References

External links
Double First at IMDB

1980s British television series
BBC television sitcoms